Gibson Lake is a lake in geographic Brimacombe Township, Algoma District in Northeastern Ontario, Canada. It is part of the Great Lakes Basin and lies adjacent to and east of Ontario Highway 17 in Lake Superior Provincial Park.

The primary outflow is an unnamed creek at the southwest to the Baldhead River, which flows to Lake Superior.

See also
List of lakes in Ontario

References

Other map sources:

Lakes of Algoma District